Charaxes chunguensis is a butterfly in the family Nymphalidae. It is found in Tanzania. The habitat consists of montane forests at altitudes from 1,700 to 2,200 meters.

The larvae possibly feed on Albizia species.

Taxonomy
It is considered a good species but very close to Charaxes mccleeryi.

References

External links
Charaxes chunguensis images at Consortium for the Barcode of Life 
African Butterfly Database Range map via search

Butterflies described in 1986
chunguensis
Endemic fauna of Tanzania
Butterflies of Africa